The TranSouth Athletic Conference (TSAC) was a college athletic conference for smaller colleges and universities located in the Southern United States.  It was affiliated with the National Association of Intercollegiate Athletics (NAIA) and competes in that organization's Region XI.

History
On August 9, 2012 it was announced that Mid-Continent University had accepted an invitation to join the American Midwest Conference, starting with the 2013-14 season.  Later, Bethel, Blue Mountain, and Martin Methodist were announced to be moving to the Southern States Athletic Conference starting with the 2013-14 season.

Chronological timeline
 1996 - The TranSouth Athletic Conference (TSAC) was founded from mostly former members of the Tennessee Collegiate Athletic Conference (TCAC). Charter members included Bethel College (now Bethel University), David Lipscomb University (a.k.a. Lipscomb University), Freed–Hardeman University, Martin Methodist College (now the University of Tennessee Southern), Trevecca Nazarene University and Union University, alongside Berry College, Birmingham–Southern College, Blue Mountain College, Lee College (now Lee University) and Williams Baptist College beginning the 1996-97 academic year.
 1997 - Lyon College joined the TSAC in the 1997-98 academic year.
 1999 - Bethel (Tenn.) left the TSAC to join the Kentucky Intercollegiate Athletic Conference (KIAC) after the 1998-99 academic year.
 2001 - Three institutions left the TSAC to join their respective new home primary conferences: Birmingham–Southern and Lipscomb to the Division I ranks of the National Collegiate Athletic Association (NCAA) as NCAA D-II Independents, and Williams Baptist to the American Midwest Conference, all  after the 2000-01 academic year.
 2002 - Cumberland University of Tennessee joined the TSAC in the 2002-03 academic year.
 2004 - Berry and Lee left the TSAC to join the Southern States Athletic Conference (SSAC) after the 2003-04 academic year.
 2005 - Crichton College (later Victory University) joined the TSAC in the 2005-06 academic year.
 2006 - Lambuth University and Mid-Continent University joined the TSAC (with Bethel [Tenn.] re-joining) in the 2006-07 academic year.
 2008 - Lambuth and Victory (formerly Crichton) left the TSAC to become NAIA Independents as charter members of the Association of Independent Institutions (AII; now the Continental Athletic Conference) after the 2007-08 academic year. At the same time, Lambuth began transition to the NCAA Division II ranks as an NCAA D-II Independent.
 2012 - Four institutions left the TSAC to join their respective new home primary conferences: Trevecca Nazarene to the Great Midwest Athletic Conference (G-MAC) and Union (Tenn.) to the Gulf South Conference (GSC) (both into the NCAA Division II ranks), Lyon to the American Midwest, and Cumberland (Tenn.) to the Mid-South Conference, all after the 2011-12 academic year.
 2012 - Life University joined the TSAC in the 2012-13 academic year.
 2013 - The TSAC would cease operations as an athletic conference after the 2012-13 academic year; as many schools left to join their respective new home primary conferences beginning the 2013-14 academic year: Freed–Hardeman and Mid-Continent to the American Midwest, Bethel (Tenn.), Blue Mountain and Martin Methodist (now UT Southern) to the SSAC, and Life returning as an NAIA Independent (before joining the Mid-South since the 2014-15 academic year).

Member schools

Final members
On its final season, the TSAC had six member schools, which most were private schools:

Notes

Former members

Notes

Membership timeline

Sponsored sports

Men's sponsored sports were baseball, basketball, cross country, golf, soccer, and tennis.  Women's sports sponsored were basketball, cross country, golf, soccer, softball, tennis, and volleyball.

References

Defunct NAIA conferences
Sports in the Southern United States